Internoretia is a genus of brown algae in the family Acinetosporaceae.

References

External links

Ectocarpales
Brown algae genera